Uranyl zinc acetate (ZnUO2(CH3COO)4) is a compound of uranium.

Uranyl zinc acetate is used as a laboratory reagent in the determination of sodium concentrations of solutions using a method of quantitatively precipitating sodium with uranyl zinc acetate and gravimetrically determining the sodium as uranyl zinc sodium acetate, (UO2)3ZnNa(CH3CO2)9·6H2O. The presence of caesium and rubidium does not interfere with this reaction, but the presence of potassium and lithium must be removed prior to analysis.

This method was important to determine Na in urine for diagnostic purposes. Zinc uranyl acetate is sometimes called "sodium reagent"  since pale yellow NaZn(UO2)3(C2H3O2)9 is one of the very few insoluble sodium compounds.

Laboratory use
Uranyl zinc acetate has been used as a catalyst for converting dimethyl carbonate into toluene-2,4-diisocyanate (TDI).

References

Uranyl compounds
Zinc compounds
Acetates
Coordination complexes